Seka (born Dorothiea Ivonniea Hundley, April 15, 1954) also known as Dorothea Hundley Patton, is an entrepreneur and retired American pornographic actress who performed full-time from 1977 to 1982, and on a limited basis in the mid-1990s and early 2000s. She was known as the Platinum Princess of Porn. In 2013, she released her autobiography about her life and career, titled Inside Seka.

Early life
Dorothea Hundley was born and raised in Radford, Virginia, having, she recalled, "a plain, normal childhood" with two siblings, a brother and sister. She describes her ancestry as Cherokee and Irish. Her family later moved to Hopewell, Virginia, where nicknamed "Dottie," she won a high-school beauty pageant, being named Ms. Hopewell High School or Miss Hopewell High School (accounts vary) and became Miss Southside Virginia.

Hundley married Francis "Frank" Patton on April 21, 1972, a week after her 18th birthday. She and Patton divorced before she began her pornographic career in 1977. She worked for Reynolds Metals Company, maker of Reynolds Wrap household aluminum, and later became a clerk at an adult bookstore, where she began dating the married owner.

Career
She described her entry into pornographic films, following her move from the East Coast to Las Vegas and then to Los Angeles,

Seka's early pornographic pseudonyms included Linda Grasser. She eventually adopted the screen name Seka, after a female blackjack dealer she knew in Las Vegas. (She married actor-turned-director Kenneth M. Yontz the year after her porn debut; they divorced in 1980.) She went on to star in more than 200 adult videos with a "break" in 1982, when she stopped shooting sex movies, claiming "they wouldn't pay her what she wanted," and turned to stripping and nude modeling while also running her own fan club. Subsequently, she admitted that the HIV epidemic in the mid-1980s contributed to her decision to avoid the hardcore sex scene, saying, "That's why I don't make movies any more ... I like to live." 

By the early 1990s she had returned to the porn industry to perform in a few final movies, her last being American Garter.

Jamie Gillis performed with Seka numerous times and considered her to be "a bit above porn", describing her as a "white trash queen." Among her fellow performers, she listed her favorite male screen partners as Gillis, John Holmes, Mike Ranger and Paul Thomas. In terms of female screen partners, she rated her favorites as Veronica Hart, Aunt Peg, Kay Parker and Candida Royalle.

Other ventures
In 1994, Seka hosted a radio talk show in Chicago called Let's Talk About Sex on Saturday nights (10:00 pm to 2:00 am, local time) on station 97.9FM, The Loop; she hosted it for approximately three years.

In 2005, she moved from Chicago to Kansas City, operating her fan club through her 
own website. In February 2007 she stated she had just shot her first hardcore scene in nearly 15 years, available as online pay-per-view.

In 2015, she published her autobiography, Inside Seka, whose text Kerry Zukus transcribed from her dictations. Jim Norton wrote the foreword and Bobby Slayton wrote the afterword.

Appearances
She has appeared on various talk shows such as those hosted by Alan Thicke, Montel Williams, Oprah Winfrey, Larry King, Phil Donahue, and Morton Downey Jr., as well as an appearance on Saturday Night Live. Seka appeared in the 2012 documentary After Porn Ends, about life after being a porn actor.

Personal life
Aside from her marriages to Frank Patton (1972 to no later than 1977), Patrick Connelly (1987) and Kenneth M. Yontz (1978–80), Seka dated comedian Sam Kinison in the mid-'80s. She credited him for arranging an appearance with him on Saturday Night Live.

In the DVD commentary for his film, director Paul Thomas Anderson stated that she was the main inspiration for his character of Amber Waves in Boogie Nights, due to her appearance and involvement with John Holmes in the documentary Exhausted: John C. Holmes, The Real Story.

Awards and recognition
Seka is a member of the AVN Hall of Fame, and the X-Rated Critics Organization Hall of Fame.

In the 2000 film Charlie's Angels, Drew Barrymore's character, Dylan Sanders, wears a disguise while at a racetrack, that made her resemble Seka.

Electronic musician Aphex Twin sampled Seka for the track "Come on You Slags!" from his album ...I Care Because You Do.

Partial filmography
Teenage Desires (1978) (footage from 1974)
Dracula Sucks (1978)
Heavenly Desire (1979) (film debut)
Rockin' with Seka (1980)
The Seduction of Cindy (1980)
Prisoner of Paradise (1980)
Exhausted: John C. Holmes, the Real Story (1981)
Blond Heat (1985) (opposite John Leslie)
Careful, He May Be Watching (1987)
American Garter (1993)
Desperately Seeking Seka (2002)

Bibliography

References

External links

 
 
 
 
 XXX Hall of Famer and 70s/80s icon SEKA gets down with Legendary Rock Interviews

1954 births
American pornographic film actresses
American female adult models
American people of Cherokee descent
American people of Irish descent
Living people
People from Radford, Virginia
Pornographic film actors from Virginia
21st-century American actresses